Michael (Mick) David Gentleman (born 1 August 1955) is an Australian politician and is a member of the Australian Capital Territory Legislative Assembly representing the electorate of Brindabella for the Labor Party. He was first elected to the assembly in 2004, but lost his seat in the 2008 election. He was re-elected to the assembly at the 2012 election, 2016 election and 2020 election. Mick Gentleman has been a Minister in the ACT Government since 2014.

Early years
Gentleman was born and educated, and has always lived in Canberra, Australian Capital Territory.

Prior to becoming a politician, he worked in the offices of Prime Ministers Bob Hawke and Paul Keating as their security officer. He has also been a motor mechanic, postman, public servant, real estate agent, small business owner and union organiser.

Gentleman has been involved in motorsports for more than 42 years and was a four times ACT Rally champion co-driver. He competed in rally at state level, Australia Championship level and in the World Rally Championships.

Political career
Gentleman has served as the Acting Speaker and chair of the Standing Committee on Planning and Environment. He provided more than 30 reports to the parliament affecting the business, environmental and residential planning of the capital. Gentleman tabled and passed the gross feed-in-tariff for Canberra, bringing the ACT to the forefront in renewable energy incentives.

Gentleman has strongly supported first-responders as Minister for Police and Emergency Services, securing more police officers, paramedics and urban firefighters for the ACT.

As Minister for the Environment, Gentleman led reforms to outlaw destructive yabby traps and oversaw the recovery plan for Namadgi National Park, which was significantly damaged by bushfires in early 2020. Gentleman has been a public advocate for protecting Namadgi National Park from potential damage caused by feral horses.

Gentleman is currently the 
Minister for Planning and Land Management (February 2016–present),
Minister for Police and Emergency Services (October 2016–present). Minister for Corrections (November 2020–present) and Minister for Industrial Relations and Workplace Safety (November 2020–present).

He has also held the following ministries: Minister for the Environment and Heritage (October 2016–October 2020), Minister for Advanced Technology and Space Industries (August 2019–October 2020), Minister assisting the Chief Minister on Advanced Technology and Space Industries (August 2018–August 2019),
Minister for Urban Renewal (October 2016–August 2018),
Minister for Planning (7 July 2014–January 2016), Minister for Roads and Parking (20 January 2015–February 2016),
Minister for Workplace Safety and Industrial Relations (7 July 2014–October 2016),
Minister for Children and Young People (7 July 2014–February 2016),
Minister for Ageing (7 July 2014–February 2016),
Minister for Community Services (7 July 2014 – 20 January 2015),
Minister for Gaming and Racing (February 2016–October 2016).

References

External links
 Biography – ACT Labor Party
 Profile – ACT Legislative Assembly

1955 births
Living people
Australian Labor Party members of the Australian Capital Territory Legislative Assembly
Members of the Australian Capital Territory Legislative Assembly
21st-century Australian politicians